Radin Inten II (January 1, 1834 – October 5, 1858) is now regarded as a National Hero of Indonesia. The Radin Inten II International Airport in Bandar Lampung is named after him.For his actions,he was rewarded the title only given to brave soldiers,"Kesuma Bangsa".

References

External links
Lampung--Brief history.

National Heroes of Indonesia
Lampung
Raden Inten
People from Lampung